Tilgate & Furnace Green is an electoral division of West Sussex in the United Kingdom, and returns one member to sit on West Sussex County Council.

Extent
The division covers the neighbourhoods of Furnace Green and Tilgate, which form part of the urban area of the town of Crawley.

It falls entirely within the un-parished area of Crawley Borough and comprises the following borough wards: Furnace Green Ward and Tilgate Ward.

Election results

2021 Election 
Results of the election held on 6 May 2021:

2017 Election 
Results of the election held on 4 May 2017:

2013 Election 
Results of the election held on 2 May 2013:

2009 Election
Results of the election held on 4 June 2009:

2005 Election
Results of the election held on 5 May 2005:

References
Election Results - West Sussex County Council

External links
 West Sussex County Council
 Election Maps

Electoral Divisions of West Sussex